Half Moon Crater is a volcanic crater  southwest of Castle Rock on Hut Point Peninsula, Ross Island, Antarctica. It was descriptively named for its shape by Frank Debenham of the British Antarctic Expedition in 1910–13, who made a plane table survey of the peninsula in 1912.

References

Volcanoes of Ross Island
Volcanic craters